Benedict Hollerbach (born 17 May 2001) is a German professional footballer who plays as a left winger or centre-forward for  side Wehen Wiesbaden. He has played for Germany at under-18 level.

Club career
After playing youth football with TSV Tutzing, Bayern Munich and VfB Stuttgart, Hollerbach signed for Wehen Wiesbaden on a three-year contract in September 2020.

International career
Hollerbach has represented Germany at under-18 level.

References

External links
 
 
 

2001 births
Living people
People from Starnberg
Sportspeople from Upper Bavaria
German footballers
Footballers from Bavaria
Association football wingers
Association football forwards
Germany youth international footballers
3. Liga players
SV Wehen Wiesbaden players